"Driving Wheels" is a song by Australian rock singer, Jimmy Barnes. It was released in January 1988 as the second single from Barnes' third studio album, Freight Train Heart. The song peaked at number 12 in Australia while reaching No. 19 on the New Zealand Singles Chart.

Track listing
7" single (K 488) /12" single (X 13308)'''
Side A "Driving Wheels" - 5:19
Side B "Different Lives" - 3:36

Music video
A music video was produced to promote the single.

Charts

References

1988 singles
1987 songs
Songs written by Jonathan Cain
Mushroom Records singles
Jimmy Barnes songs
Songs written by Jimmy Barnes